William Reynolds VC (1827 – 20 October 1869) was a Scottish recipient of the Victoria Cross, the highest and most prestigious award for gallantry in the face of the enemy that can be awarded to British and Commonwealth forces. Reynolds was the first private to receive the award.

Details

He was about 27 years old, and a private in the Scots Fusilier Guards, British Army during the Crimean War when the following deed took place for which he was awarded the VC.

On 20 September 1854 at the Battle of the Alma, Crimean Peninsula, when the formation of the line was disordered, Private Reynolds behaved with conspicuous gallantry, in rallying the men round the Colours.

Further information
He later achieved the rank of corporal.

The medal
His Victoria Cross is displayed at The Guards Regimental Headquarters (Scots Guards RHQ), Wellington Barracks, Chelsea, London, England.

References

Monuments to Courage (David Harvey, 1999)
The Register of the Victoria Cross (This England, 1997)
Scotland's Forgotten Valour (Graham Ross, 1995)

External links
 Scots Guards Regimental and Association Website
Location of grave and VC medal (Brookwood Cemetery)
The Brookwood Cemetery Society (Known Holders of the Victoria Cross Commemorated in Brookwood Cemetery)
Special ceremony at Edinburgh Castle in April 2007
 

British recipients of the Victoria Cross
Crimean War recipients of the Victoria Cross
British Army personnel of the Crimean War
Military personnel from Edinburgh
Scots Guards soldiers
1827 births
1869 deaths
Burials at Brookwood Cemetery
British Army recipients of the Victoria Cross